Honeymoon Lane is a 1931 American pre-Code comedy film directed by William James Craft and starring Eddie Dowling, June Collyer, Raymond Hatton. The film was released on July 25, 1931, by Paramount Pictures. It is based on the 1926 Broadway musical of the same title by Dowling and James F. Hanley.

Synopsis
Card dealer Tim Dugan falls in love with Mary, the niece of owner of the casino where he works. Complications ensue when he is accused of allowing a female customer to win big and is fired from his job.

Cast  
Eddie Dowling as Tim Dugan
June Collyer as Mary Baggott
Raymond Hatton as Dynamite
Ray Dooley as Gerty Murphy
Noah Beery, Sr. as Tom Baggott
Mary Carr as Mother Murphy
Armand Kaliz as King of Bulgravia
Adolph Milar as Paulino
Lloyd Whitlock as Arnold Bookstein
George Kotsonaros as Nolay
Corliss Palmer as Betty Royce
Walter Brennan as Driver
Gene Lewis as Col. Gustave
Ethel Wales as Mrs. Gotrocks

References

Bibliography
 Bradley, Edwin M. The First Hollywood Musicals: A Critical Filmography of 171 Features, 1927 through 1932. McFarland, 2004.

External links 
 

1931 films
American comedy films
1931 comedy films
Paramount Pictures films
Films directed by William James Craft
American black-and-white films
American films based on plays
1930s English-language films
1930s American films